The Men's 5000m race for class T46 amputee athletes at the 2004 Summer Paralympics was a single race held in the Athens Olympic Stadium. It was won by Samir Nouioua, representing .

Final round

27 Sept. 2004, 21:05

References

M